Roaring Roads is a 1935 American action film directed by Charles E. Roberts and Ray Nazarro. It featured three actors from the Our Gang films: David Sharpe, Mary Kornman and Mickey Daniels. It was the second and last film in the series Our Young Friends, the first being Adventurous Knights.

Plot summary 
A rich boy (Sharpe) who likes to take risks escapes from his overprotective aunts. Pursued by crooks, he is aided in his adventures by Gertie (McDowell), Mary (Kornman) and Mickie (Daniels).

Cast 
David Sharpe as David Morton aka David Smith
Gertrude Messinger as Gertrude "Gertie" McDowell
Mary Kornman as Mary McDowell
Mickey Daniels as Mickey Daniels
Jack Mulhall as Donald McDowell
Eddie Phillips as Gangster
Vera Lewis as Aunt Harriet
Heinie Conklin as Bodyguard
Al Thompson as Bodyguard
Matty Fain as Henchman
Charles Moyer as Henchman
Helen Hunt as Aunt Agatha
Fred Kohler Jr. as Sam

References

External links 

1935 films
American auto racing films
1935 drama films
1930s English-language films
American black-and-white films
1930s action drama films
American action drama films
Films directed by Ray Nazarro
1930s American films